Mimosa Hall is a Greek Revival mansion in Roswell, Georgia, built in 1841. It is one of several historically significant buildings in the city and is a contributing property of the Roswell Historic District on the National Register of Historic Places.

History
The antebellum mansion sits on a  estate originally built in 1841 for John Dunwoody, one of the shareholders in the Roswell Manufacturing Company. General Andrew J. Hansell purchased the home in 1869 from George H. Camp and named the home after the mimosa trees contained on the property. Mrs. Barrington King purchased the house in 1898.

Architect Neel Reid purchased the home in 1916, reconstituted the courtyard and gardens, designed the fieldstone driveway, converted the twin parlors into a large drawing room, and added modern plumbing, electricity and a furnace. Reid bought the front door from an old house on lower Fifth Avenue in New York City that was home to the first Bishop of New York and installed at Mimosa Hall. After Reid's death in 1926, his family retained ownership until 1937.

The house was purchased by Granger Hansell, great-grandson of General Hansell, in 1947. The home and surrounding  was listed at $3.85 million. The City of Roswell purchased the  Mimosa Hall property in 2017 for $2,950,000 from then-owner Sally Hansell utilizing financing from a 10-year Georgia Municipal Association installment loan. After purchasing the estate, the City spent  $300,000 for structural analysis, tree assessments, fireplace repairs and a solar roof. The City opened the house in late 2021 as a special events facility available for public rental.

An 1841 fire damaged the original wooden walls and brick was used to rebuild them in 1846. The home contains four bedrooms and four bathrooms and is 6,308 square feet in size  The interior contains three rare panels painted in 1881. One of the panels depicts the Three Graces - Cupid, Psyche and Venus.

The estate grounds contain many different species of trees including Osage orange, deciduous oriental magnolia and yellowwood., with 14 of the original 15 gardens still intact with features including a cutting garden, a rose garden, a weeping tree garden, a sunken garden, and a reflecting pool and garden.

See also

List of National Historic Landmarks in Georgia
National Register of Historic Places listings in Fulton County, Georgia

References

External links

 Friends of Mimosa Hall & Gardens
 Mimosa Hall & Gardens (City of Roswell)

Antebellum architecture
Houses completed in 1841
Roswell, Georgia
Houses on the National Register of Historic Places in Georgia (U.S. state)
Historic district contributing properties in Georgia (U.S. state)
Plantation houses in Georgia (U.S. state)
Historic house museums in Georgia (U.S. state)
Museums in Fulton County, Georgia
Tourist attractions in Roswell, Georgia
National Register of Historic Places in Roswell, Georgia
Houses in Fulton County, Georgia